Rita Blanca Creek, also known as Mustang Creek, forms in two branches in Union County, New Mexico.  It enters Texas near Texline, and its branches join southeast of that location.  It then continues about sixty-two miles generally southeast to flow into Punta de Agua Creek and then into Canadian River.

Lake Rita Blanca is on the creek just south of Dalhart, Texas.  It is inside the former Rita Blanca State Park, now maintained by the City of Dalhart, and the site of Rita Blanca Canyon. The lake is 160 acres, and is surrounded by the 1,680-acre park.  The park has playground equipment and hiking/biking/riding trails.  The city has added a Lake Center at which guests can check-out various items such as bicycles, board games, fishing poles & tackle, golf discs, and more.

See also
List of rivers of Texas

References

References

USGS Geographic Names Information Service
USGS Hydrologic Unit Map - State of Texas (1974)

Rivers of Texas
Tributaries of the Arkansas River